Jhun Alexander Ferrer, also known by his stage name Newkid (born 2 December 1990), is a Swedish–Filipino rapper signed to Sony Music Entertainment.

Career 
Jhun Alexander Ferrer was born in Uddevalla, Sweden in 1990 to a Swedish mother and a Spanish–Filipino father.

Adopting the stage name Newkid, he released his debut studio album on 15 April 2011, named Alexander JR Ferrer and his debut single in Sweden was "Jag gråter bara i regnet". He is also featured on Lorentz & Sakarias songs "Lever min dröm" and "Swischa förbi", as well as Ison & Fille's song "Lever såhär". Ferrer released the EP SS18 in the summer of 2018, which peaked at number 21 on the Swedish Albums Chart. He released his second studio album, SS/AW18, later that year. He also featured on Tjuvjakts single "Apelsinskal", which peaked at number eleven on the Swedish Singles Chart. On 24 April 2020, he released the single "Kanske var vi rätt bra ändå". It peaked at number six on the Swedish Singles Chart. A music video for the song was released on Newkids YouTube channel on 29 April 2020. Swedish newspaper Aftonbladet stated that Newkid will participate in the upcoming eleventh season of TV4s TV-show Så mycket bättre, which will be recorded in June 2020.

Newkid announced he would his third studio album in 2020. He released the single "Chambea" on 22 May 2020. On 29 May, Newkid released his previously announced third studio album, titled Mount Jhun. It peaked at number three on the Swedish Albums Chart, making it Newkid's first album to make the top 10 on the chart. The album contains the previously released singles "Kanske var vi rätt bra ändå", "Mi Amor", "Chambea" and "Över dig".

Discography

Albums

Singles
(The singles are mostly adapted from Spotify.)

Featured singles

Other charted songs

Notes

References 

1990 births
Living people
Swedish singer-songwriters
Swedish male singers
Swedish-language singers
Swedish people of Filipino descent
Swedish rappers